Pablo Hernán Gómez (20 December 1977 – 29 January 2001) was an Argentine football striker who played professionally in Argentina and Mexico.

Career
Born in Las Heras, Mendoza, Gómez began playing football as a striker in the local Mendoza state league with Huracán de Las Heras at age 17. He joined local side Godoy Cruz Antonio Tomba in 1996, before he had a brief stint with Argentine Primera División side Argentinos Juniors during the 1997 Apertura tournament.

In 1998, Goméz moved abroad at age 21, joining Mexican Primera División side Monarcas Morelia. He made his Primera debut in 1998, but soon fell out of favor with the Morelia's manager at the time, Tomás Boy. He was loaned to Primera A side Tiburones Rojos de Veracruz, where he scored more than 10 goals in one season before Primera club C.F. Pachuca signed him in 1999. Gómez was an important member of Pachuca's squad, scoring six goals in the playoffs, helping the club win its first league title in 1999.

Death
On 29 January 2001, Gómez died with his wife in a traffic accident. He was returning with his family from a weekend in San Luis Potosí when his car crashed on the highway near Ixmiquilpan.

Legacy
Gómez' son, Pablo Jr is also a professional footballer, and currently plays for Mexican side Club Puebla.

References

External links

Profile at BDFA

1977 births
2001 deaths
Argentine footballers
Argentine expatriate footballers
Godoy Cruz Antonio Tomba footballers
Argentinos Juniors footballers
Atlético Morelia players
C.D. Veracruz footballers
C.F. Pachuca players
Liga MX players
Expatriate footballers in Mexico
Association football forwards
Argentine expatriate sportspeople in Mexico
Road incident deaths in Mexico
Sportspeople from Mendoza Province